Sitamarhi Bankat is a Hindu village situated in Sant Ravidas Nagar Bhadohi District Uttar Pradesh, India.This village is located on the banks of Ganga river and 11 km from Jangiganj Bazar in the middle of prayagraj and Varanasi.

it is also known as sita samahit sthal there was a huge statue of lord hanuman of 110 feet high, which has the distinction of being the world’s greatest statue of Lord Hanuman.

References

Villages in Bhadohi district